The 2020 Atlantic Coast Conference football season, part of the 2020 NCAA Division I FBS football season, is the 68th season of college football play for the Atlantic Coast Conference (ACC). It began on September 3, 2020, and ended in January 2021. For 2020, the ACC consists of 15 members in one division.

The entire 2020 schedule was released on January 22, 2020.  On July 29, a revised concept of the schedule was released in the wake of the COVID-19 pandemic.  It was announced that teams would play a ten-game conference schedule, which would include Notre Dame.  An option was left for one out-of-conference game, provided that game was played in the home state of the ACC school.

Previous season
Clemson defeated Virginia 62–17 in the ACC Football Championship Game. The victory, along with a 12–0 regular season record, earned Clemson a berth in the College Football Playoff.  The Tigers were the number three seed in the playoff and faced Ohio State in the 2019 Fiesta Bowl.  The Tigers won the game 29–23 and advanced to the National Championship game where they lost to LSU 25–42.

Preseason

ACC Kickoff

Due to the COVID-19 pandemic, the ACC announced that its 2020 Football Kickoff will be held virtually this year, instead of at the Westin in Charlotte, North Carolina.  The Kickoff will be held from July 21–23, 2020.  On July 13, it was announced that the Kickoff was postponed until further notice.  On September 4, 2020, the ACC Preseason Media Poll was released.

Preseason ACC Player of the Year

Source:

Preseason All-Conference Teams

Offense

Defense

Specialist

Source:

Recruiting classes

Coaches

Coaching changes 
The ACC entered the 2020 season with two new head football coaches:

 On November 4, 2019, Florida State head coach Willie Taggart was fired and replaced by Mike Norvell on December 7, 2019.
 On December 1, 2019, Boston College head coach Steve Addazio was fired after seven seasons and a  starting the season 2–8. Jeff Hafley was named head coach on December 14, 2019.

Head coaching records 

Notes
Records shown are prior to the 2020 season
Years at school includes the 2020 season

Rankings

Schedule

Regular season
The regular season will begin on September 10 and will end on December 5. The ACC Championship game is scheduled for December 12 or December 19, 2020.

Week one

Week two

Week three

Week four

Week five

Week six

Week seven

Week eight

Week nine

Week ten

Week eleven

Week twelve

Week thirteen

Week fourteen

Championship game

ACC vs other conferences

ACC vs Power 5 matchups
This is a list of the power conference teams (Big 10, Big 12, Pac-12, Notre Dame and SEC).  Due to the COVID-19 pandemic, Notre Dame was scheduled to play a full ACC season and was eligible for the ACC Championship game, and is therefore excluded from the list. Other Power 5 Conferences announced a conference only schedule model, and no ACC team played another Power 5 team during the regular season.

ACC vs Group of Five matchups

The following games include ACC teams competing against teams from the American, C-USA, MAC, Mountain West or Sun Belt.

ACC vs FBS independents matchups
The following games include ACC teams competing against FBS Independents, which includes Army, Liberty, New Mexico State, UConn, or UMass.

ACC vs FCS matchups

Records against other conferences

Regular Season

Post Season

Postseason

Bowl games

Rankings are from CFP rankings.  All times Eastern Time Zone.  ACC teams shown in bold.

Awards and honors

Player of the week honors

All Conference Teams

Source:

First Team

Second Team

Third Team

ACC Individual Awards

ACC Player of the Year
Trevor Lawrence, Clemson
ACC Rookie of the Year
Kyren Williams, Notre Dame
ACC Coach of the Year
Brian Kelly, Notre Dame

ACC Offensive Player of the Year
Trevor Lawrence, Clemson
ACC Offensive Rookie of the Year
Kyren Williams, Notre Dame
Jacobs Blocking Trophy
Liam Eichenberg, Notre Dame

ACC Defensive Player of the Year
Jeremiah Owusu-Koramoah, Notre Dame
ACC Defensive Rookie of the Year
Bryan Bresee, Clemson

All-Americans

Consensus All-Americans

Associated Press

AFCA

FWAA

The Sporting News

WCFF

National Award Winners
 Nolan Cooney – Brian Piccolo Award
 Jeremiah Owusu-Koramoah – Butkus Award

Home game attendance
Due to the COVID-19 pandemic, attendance was limited at all stadiums for the season.  Depending on state regulations, some universities did not allow any fans.

Bold – Exceeded capacity
†Season High

NFL Draft

The following list includes all ACC Players who were drafted in the 2021 NFL Draft

References

Further reading